The men's 5000 metre relay in short track speed skating at the 2006 Winter Olympics began with the semifinals, on 15 February, and concluded with the final on 25 February, at the Torino Palavela.

Records
Prior to this competition, the existing world and Olympic records were as follows:

The following new world and Olympic records were set during this competition.

Results

Semifinals
The two semifinals, taking place on 15 February matched four teams, each with four skaters on the ice, with the top two in each advancing to the A final. One team, Italy qualified after being interfered with. The other teams advanced to the B Final.

Semifinal 1

Semifinal 2

Finals
Two of the teams participating in Final A changed their teams between the semifinal and final rounds; Canada replaced Jonathan Guilmette with Mathieu Turcotte and South Korea replaced Oh Se-jong with Song Suk-woo.

Final A

Final B

References

Men's short track speed skating at the 2006 Winter Olympics